Stephanie M. Garcia Richard is an American politician and currently serves as the New Mexico Commissioner of Public Lands. Garcia Richard previously served as a member of the New Mexico House of Representatives from January 2013 through December 2018, representing the 43rd district. She chaired the House Education Committee and served on the Appropriates and Finance Committee and Labor and Economic Development committees.

Education
Garcia Richard was born in Tucumcari, New Mexico and raised in Silver City. She earned a Bachelor of Arts in political science from Barnard College, and her teaching certificate from UCLA.

Career
Garcia Richard has served in New Mexican politics since her first election 2012.

New Mexico Commissioner of Public Lands
Garcia Richard was elected as New Mexico Commissioner of Public Lands during the 2018 New Mexico elections, and began serving in this position on January 1, 2019. She is the first woman and first Latina to serve in the position.

New Mexico House of Representatives
Garcia Richard was first elected to the New Mexico House of Representatives in 2012 for District 43. She represented the district from 2013 through 2018. She served on the Education and Labor & Economic Development committees. During the 2017 and 2018 Legislative Session, She served as chair for the House Education Committee. During her tenure in the House of Representatives, Garcia Richard sponsored 105 bills and acted as co-sponsor for 115 bills.

Personal life
Stephanie Garcia Richard was born in Tucumcari, New Mexico, and raised in Silver City. She is married to Eric Vasquez and has two adult children.

Election history
Election history of Stephanie Garcia Richard from 2010.

2018

General election 
Incumbent Land Commissioner Aubrey Dunn Jr. announced that he would not be seeking re-election due to his intention to run for United States Senator. This set forth an open election between State Representative Stephanie Garcia Richard, former Land Commissioner Patrick H. Lyons, and Michael Lucero.

Democratic primary election

2016

2014

2012 

Long-time incumbent Jeannette Wallace died on April 8, 2011. Jim Hall was appointed by Governor Susana Martinez to fill the open position.

2010

General election

Democratic primary election

References

External links
Official page at the New Mexico Legislature

Stephanie Richard at Ballotpedia
Stephanie M. Richard at the National Institute on Money in State Politics

Year of birth missing (living people)
Living people
21st-century American politicians
21st-century American women politicians
Schoolteachers from New Mexico
American women educators
Barnard College alumni
Democratic Party members of the New Mexico House of Representatives
People from Los Alamos, New Mexico
People from Silver City, New Mexico
People from Tucumcari, New Mexico
UCLA Graduate School of Education and Information Studies alumni
Women state legislators in New Mexico